Ulualofaiga Talamaivao Vaela'a (died 5 September 1971) was a Western Samoan politician and paramount chief of Fagaloa. He served as a member of the Legislative Assembly from 1954 until his death, and as Minister for Health and Minister of Justice in the 1960s.

Biography
Educated at Avele School, Vaela'a spent three years working for Burns Philp before joining the police. After six years in the police force, he worked for a sawmill and then for E.A. Coxon.

In 1954 he was elected to the Legislative Assembly from the Va'a-o-Fonoti constituency. He was re-elected in 1957 elections and was a member of the 1960 Constitutional Convention and a signatory of the independence constitution. He was re-elected again in 1961, and following the 1964 elections he was appointed Minister for Health. After the 1967 elections he was moved to Minister of Justice. Although he was re-elected in 1970, he was left out of the new cabinet.

He died in hospital in Motootua in September 1971 at the age of 68.

References

Samoan police officers
Members of the Legislative Assembly of Samoa
Government ministers of Samoa
1971 deaths